

Events calendar

+7